{{Album ratings
| rev1 = Rock Hard'| rev1Score = 
}} Waking the Fury''' is the ninth studio album by the Canadian heavy metal band Annihilator, released on March 18, 2002, by SPV. It was the last album with Joe Comeau on vocals and Russ Bergquist as the touring bassist.

Track listing

Personnel
Jeff Waters - guitar, bass guitar
Joe Comeau - vocals
Russ Bergquist - bass guitar on "Nothing to Me"
Randy Black - drums
Curran Murphy - guitar

References 

Annihilator (band) albums
2002 albums
SPV/Steamhammer albums